Thomas Lawrence Noa (December 18, 1892 – March 13, 1977) was an American prelate of the Roman Catholic Church. He served as bishop of the Diocese of Marquette in Michigan from 1947 to 1968.  He previously served as coadjutor bishop of the Diocese of Sioux Falls in Iowa from 1946 to 1947.

Biography

Early life 
One of nine children, Thomas Noa was born on December 18, 1892, in Iron Mountain, Michigan, to John and Magdalene (née Walczak) Noa. He attended St. Francis Seminary in Milwaukee, Wisconsin, from 1907 to 1911.  Noa then entered the College of the Propaganda in Rome, where he earned a Doctor of Sacred Theology degree in 1917.

Priesthood 
Noa was ordained to the priesthood in Rome by Cardinal Basilio Pompili on December 23, 1916. Following his return to Michigan in 1917, he was appointed to the faculty of St. Joseph Seminary in Grand Rapids as a professor.  Noa was named rector of St. Joseph in 1927. He was named a domestic prelate by Pope Pius XI in 1935.

Coadjutor Bishop of Sioux City 
On February 22, 1946, Noa was appointed as coadjutor bishop of the Diocese of Sioux City in Iowa and titular bishop of Salona by Pope Pius XII. He received his episcopal consecration on March 19, 1946, from Cardinal Edward Mooney, with Bishops Charles Daniel White and Joseph H. Albers serving as co-consecrators.

Bishop of Marquette 
Before Noa could succeed as bishop of Sioux City, Pius XII appointed him as the eighth bishop of the Diocese of Marquette on August 25, 1947. He was installed on September 24, 1947. Noa in 1952 opened the cause, or initiative, for the canonization of the former bishop of Marquette, Frederic Baraga. In 1958, Noa issued a directive that Catholics in his diocese should not attend meetings of Moral Re-armament, an international spiritual association, citing its dangers to Catholic faith. Noa attended all four sessions of the Second Vatican Council between 1962 and 1965.

Retirement and legacy 
On January 5, 1968, Pope Paul VI accepted Noa's resignation as bishop of Marquette and appointed him as titular bishop of Talaptula. Noa resigned his titular see on December 31, 1970. Thomas Noa died on March 13, 1977, age 84.  The Bishop Noa Home, a residence for seniors in Escanaba, Michigan, is name after him.

References

External links and additional sources
 (for Chronology of Bishops) 
 (for Chronology of Bishops) 

1892 births
1977 deaths
Pontifical Urban University alumni
St. Francis Seminary (Wisconsin) alumni
People from Iron Mountain, Michigan
20th-century Roman Catholic bishops in the United States
Roman Catholic bishops of Marquette
Participants in the Second Vatican Council